Macromantis is a genus of mantises belonging to the family Photinaidae.

The species of this genus are found in Southern America.

Species:

Macromantis hyalina 
Macromantis nicaraguae 
Macromantis ovalifolia 
Macromantis saussurei

References

Mantodea
Mantodea genera